Stratford upon Avon School is an academy that educates girls and boys, 11- to 18-year-olds, in Stratford-upon-Avon, Warwickshire, England. Stratford School is a successful non-selective school that offers its students a broad spectrum of GCSE and A level options. Key Stage 3, Key Stage 4 and Key Stage 5.

Notable former pupils 
 Simon Gilbert, drummer with the band Suede
 Jack Grundy, cricketer
 Gordon Ramsay, television chef
 James Righton, co-vocalist and keyboard player of Klaxons
 Simon Taylor-Davis, lead guitarist and backing vocalist of Klaxons
 Juliette Thomas, interior designer

References

External links
 Stratford-upon-Avon School website

Buildings and structures in Stratford-upon-Avon
Academies in Warwickshire
Secondary schools in Warwickshire